Being at Home with Claude is a 1992 Canadian drama film directed by Jean Beaudin and based on the play by René-Daniel Dubois. The film stars Roy Dupuis as Yves, a gay man who has just murdered his lover Claude (Jean-François Pichette), and is attempting to explain his reasons to the police investigator (Jacques Godin).

The film premiered at the Rendez-vous du cinéma québécois in February 1992. It was also screened in the Un Certain Regard section at the 1992 Cannes Film Festival.

The film was co-produced by Les Productions du Cerf and the National Film Board of Canada.

Cast

Critical response
Ray Conlogue of The Globe and Mail criticized Beaudin's decision to depict Claude's murder as the very first scene in the movie, writing that it robbed the movie of "the precious ambiguity of our feelings about Yves. Instead of letting him lead us - along with the police interrogator - slowly, carefully, with almost virginal reticence, into the interior world that dictated Claude's death, we are slapped in the face with it." He ultimately concluded that the film's success or failure "depends on whether you can persuade yourself that Dubois, self-styled 'transgressor of our fears' and gainsayer of God, succeeds in his project. If he does, then the film does. For my part, I found it a brilliant essay in moral myopia."

Craig MacInnis of the Toronto Star criticized the casting of Dupuis in the lead role, calling him a "human side of beef" who was "not equal to the demands of the script", and compared his performance unfavourably to the performance of Lothaire Bluteau in the original stage play.

Rick Groen of The Globe and Mail identified the film's religious underpinnings, writing that "it's a short jump from Romance to religion ("He transfigured me. He's alive in me"), and Beaudin adds a few Catholic fillips to the tale - the judge's chamber comes with stained-glass windows, the Inspector is clearly a father-confessor, and the murder is filmed as a blood-and-wine sacrament. But that's really only ornamental. Beneath the ornamentation, there's a sturdier reason why this work has the power to cut across different audiences and survive its different castings (here, Godin is hard-working and wonderful; Dupuis is merely hard-working). And the reason is simple. For all its seamy, aberrant, amoral exterior, what we're actually seeing is a typically Keatsian lament "half in love with easeful Death," a classically blissful tragedy complete with star-crossed duo."

Awards
The film received nine Genie Award nominations at the 13th Genie Awards:
Best Motion Picture
Best Director (Beaudin)
Best Actor (Godin)
Best Art Direction/Production Design (François Séguin)
Best Cinematography (Thomas Vámos)
Best Editing (André Corriveau)
Best Overall Sound (Jo Caron, Michel Descombes, Michel Charron and Luc Boudrias)
Best Sound Editing (Jérôme Décarie, Mathieu Beaudin, Carole Gagnon and Marcel Pothier)
Best Original Score (Richard Grégoire)
Grégoire won the award for Best Original Score.

References

External links 

1992 films
1990s French-language films
Canadian crime drama films
Films based on Canadian plays
Canadian LGBT-related films
Films shot in Montreal
Films set in Montreal
Films directed by Jean Beaudin
1992 crime drama films
National Film Board of Canada films
LGBT-related drama films
1992 LGBT-related films
Gay-related films
Canadian LGBT-related plays
French-language Canadian films
1990s Canadian films